Alex Rokobaro (born 6 October 1989) is a Fijian rugby union footballer who plays for the Old Collegians Rugby Club in South Australia Rugby Union. His usual position is fullback, although he can play other positions including Wing.

Early career
Rokobaro began playing Rugby Union in his hometown of Adelaide, South Australia for Old Collegians. He moved to Brisbane, and attended Marist College Ashgrove and played both Rugby Union and Australian Rules Football.

As fly-half for Fiji at the 2008 Junior World Cup Rokobaro helped Fiji beat Tonga 25 to 10.
After relocating to Sydney, New South Wales, Rokobaro helped Sydney Uni Football Club win the Colts Premiership in 2009.

In 2011–12 he played for French club Stade Français, and scored 32 points in ten appearances.

Super Rugby
Rokobaro was drafted into the NSW Waratahs Academy in 2010. In 2011 he played as an outside back for the Rebels development team.

After his time in France he returned down under to sign with the Melbourne Rebels for the 2013 Super Rugby season. He made his Rebels debut in February 2013, against the Brumbies. Eight minutes into the second half, he come on after the injured fullback James O'Connor left the field. Kingi moved to fullback, and Rokobaro took Kingi's place on the right wing.

He played only 2 games in 2014 and bowed out of super rugby in the final round game against the Bulls.

International career
In October 2013, he was named in the Fiji team for the 2013 end-of-year rugby union tests and he made his debut off the bench against Portugal.

References

External links 
Alex Rokobaro Melbourne Rebels Profile
Alex Rokobaro Old Collegians Profile

1989 births
Australian rugby union players
Fijian rugby union players
Fiji international rugby union players
Australian people of I-Taukei Fijian descent
Rugby union fullbacks
Sportspeople from Adelaide
Melbourne Rebels players
Stade Français players
Rugby Calvisano players
Australian expatriate rugby union players
Expatriate rugby union players in France
Expatriate rugby union players in Italy
Australian expatriate sportspeople in France
Australian expatriate sportspeople in Italy
Living people
People from Yasawa
I-Taukei Fijian people
Fijian emigrants to Australia